Mikhalakis Skouroumounis (born 16 November 1956) is a Cypriot judoka. He competed in the men's extra-lightweight event at the 1988 Summer Olympics.

References

1956 births
Living people
Cypriot male judoka
Olympic judoka of Cyprus
Judoka at the 1988 Summer Olympics
Place of birth missing (living people)